Janet Dibley (born 13 December 1958) is an English actress. She is known for her roles as Elaine Walker in the 1980s sitcom The Two of Us, Lorna Cartwright in the BBC soap opera EastEnders, and Elaine Cassidy in the BBC soap opera Doctors.

Life and career
Dibley was born on 13 December 1958 in Doncaster. In April 1976, before training at the Rose Bruford College, she appeared in GAS with the National Student Drama Festival, which won the Royal Shakespeare Company's inaugural Buzz Goodbody Award and The Festival Judges' Awards.

Dibley came to public attention playing Elaine in ITV's The Two of Us, a sitcom about a co-habiting couple, which also featured  Nicholas Lyndhurst. 
In 1993, Dibley played the part of Linda in The Gingerbread Girl, a series about a single mother trying to raise her daughter. She then played Lorna Cartwright in the BBC soap opera EastEnders. However, it was reported that she decided to leave the show because she was uncomfortable with the plans for her character; the script writers proposed Lorna became a prostitute and then be gang raped. Dibley agreed an exit strategy, and the plan was abandoned. The producers of  Eastenders had planned to make her a central character.

Dibley starred in the BBC drama The Chase, and joined the regular cast of BBC One's daytime soap opera Doctors in August 2010 playing Dr. Elaine Cassidy until September 2012. She appeared in Broadchurch in 2015, and also writes.

Dibley reprised her role of Lorna Cartwright in EastEnders on 17 March 2016. Dibley has also done theatre work with the National Theatre and had roles in Mr Cinders, Carousel, Twelfth Night, Figaro, Guys and Dolls and Cinderella.

Dibley married the actor Tyler Butterworth in 1998; the couple have two sons.

Filmography
Loved by You
Doctors
EastEnders
Band of Gold
The Chase
Fat Friends
The Two of Us
Casualty
Heartbeat
Broadchurch
Unforgotten
Coronation Street
 Shakespeare & Hathaway: Private Investigators – Series 2, Episode 4, "Beware the Ides of March" (2019) as Julienne Fortby
 Midsomer Murders - Series 13, Episode 5, "Master Class" (2010) as Dawn Stock
 Unforgotten - Series 4, (2021) Jenny

References

External links
 

1958 births
Living people
Actors from Doncaster
Actresses from Yorkshire
Alumni of Rose Bruford College
English television actresses
English soap opera actresses